RAF St Pancras was a temporary, but official, Royal Air Force station established in the Somers Town Goods Yard beside St Pancras railway station in London. The base was opened and closed in May 1969 in order to serve the winning entry of Flt Lt Tom Lecky-Thompson and Harrier XV741 in the Daily Mail Trans-Atlantic Air Race.

See also
List of former Royal Air Force stations

References

St Pancras
Military units and formations disestablished in 1969